Sianav or Sianow or Seyanav may refer to:
 Sianav, Kamyaran
 Sianav, Marivan